The 1918 Syracuse Orangemen football team represented Syracuse University in the 1918 college football season.

Schedule

References

Syracuse
Syracuse Orange football seasons
Syracuse Orangemen football